This is a list of castles in South Tyrol in Italy.

 Castle Aichberg, Eppan an der Weinstraße
 Altenburg bei St. Pauls, Eppan an der Weinstraße
 Annaberg, Goldrain 
 Castle Auer, Tirol
 Castleruine Boymont, Eppan an der Weinstraße
 Castle Bruneck, Bruneck
 Brunnenburg, Tirol
 Churburg, Schluderns
 Castle Enn, Montan
 Castle Ehrenburg, Kiens
 Castleruine Eschenloch, Ulten
 Fahlburg, Tisens-Prissian
 Castle Festenstein
 Fingellerschlössl/Walbenstein, Sarntal
 Fischburg, in Sëlva
 Castle Freudenstein, Eppan an der Weinstraße
 Fürstenburg, Mals 
 Castle Gandegg, Eppan an der Weinstraße
 Castleruine Goien, Schenna
 Castle Goldrain, Goldrain 
 Castle Gravetsch, Villanders
 Castle Greifenstein, Terlan, (aka. Sauschloss (Pig Castle))
 Haderburg, Salorno
 Haselburg, Bolzano
 Castle Hauenstein, Seis am Schlern
 Castle Hocheppan, Eppan an der Weinstraße
 Johanneskofel, Sarntal
 Castel Juval, Naturns
 Castleruine Kaldiff, Neumarkt
 Castle Karneid, Karneid
 Castle Kasatsch, Nals, (aka. Castle Pfefferberg)
 Castle Kastelbell, Kastelbell-Tschars
 Castle Katzenzungen, Tisens-Prissian
 Castle Klebenstein, Bolzano
 Castle Laimburg, Vadena
 Castle Lamprechtsburg, Bruneck
 Landesfürstliche Burg, Meran
 Leuchtenburg, Italy, Vadena
 Castle Lichtenberg, Prad am Stilfserjoch
 Castle Lebenberg, Tscherms
 Castle Maretsch, Bolzano
 Marienberg, Mals (a former castle, now an abbey)
 Castle Matschatsch, Eppan an der Weinstraße
 Michelsburg, St. Lorenzen
 Castle Moos, Eppan an der Weinstraße
 Mühlbacher Klause, Mühlbach
 Castle Neuhaus, Gais
 Castle Neuhaus, Terlan (aka. Castle Maultasch]
 Castle Niemandsfreund, Kastelruth
 Schloss Nussegg, Kurtatsch
 Castle Obermontani, Morter 
 Castle Payrsberg, Nals
 Castle Pienzenau, Meran
 Prösels Castle, Völs am Schlern
 Castleruine Rafenstein, Bolzano
 Castle Reichenberg, Taufers im Münstertal 
 Castle Reifenegg, Ratschings
 Reifenstein Castle, Sterzing
 Castle Ried, Ritten
 Castle Rodenegg, Rodeneck
 Rotund, Taufers im Münstertal 
 Runkelstein Castle, Bolzano
 Monastery Säben, earlier Castle Säben, Klausen
 Castle Salegg, Seis am Schlern
 Castle Schenna, Schenna
 Schlandersburg, Schlanders
 Castle Schöneck, Kiens
 Castle Schwanburg, Nals
 Sigmundskron Castle, a big fortress, Bolzano
 Monastery Sonnenburg, earlier Castle Sonnenburg, St. Lorenzen
 Castle Sprechenstein, Freienfeld/Sterzing
 Castleruine Stein am Ritten, Ritten
 Castle Stetteneck, Urtijëi
 Castle Strassberg, Sterzing
 Castle Summersberg, Gufidaun
 Castle Tarantsberg
 Castle Taufers, Sand in Taufers
 Tirol Castle, Tirol
 Castle Thurn, San Martin de Tor
 Castle Thurnstein, Tirol
 Trauttmansdorff Castle, Meran
 Treuenstein Castle, Bozen/Bolzano
 Trostburg, Waidbruck
 Tschenglsburg, Tschengls
 Unterkofeler Schlössl, Afing
 Castle Untermontani, Morter 
 Castle Velthurns, Felthurns
 Castle Wangen-Bellermont, Ritten
 Castle Warth, Eppan an der Weinstraße
 Wehrburg, Tisens
 Castle Weineck, Bolzano
 Castle Welsperg, Welsberg
 Castle Wolfsthurn, Mareit
 Castle Wolkenstein, Sëlva
 Zenoburg, Meran
 Castle Zwingenburg, Tisens

See also
List of castles in Italy

South Tyrol